Jakob Rosenberg (September 5, 1893 – April 7, 1980) was an art historian, museum curator, and educator who is noted particularly for published work on Rembrandt. He was active in Germany until his 1937 emigration to the United States, where he joined the faculty of Harvard University. In addition to his professorship he was the curator of prints at the Fogg Museum. Rosenberg retired in 1964, but continued his scholarly activities until his 1980 death in Cambridge, Massachusetts.

Rosenberg was born in Berlin into a family of art dealers. His brother Saemy Rosenberg (1893–1971) continued the business in Germany, the Netherlands, and the United States. During the years 1912 to 1914 he first did an internship in the art trade in Munich. After serving in a cavalry unit in World War I he was wounded, captured by the British and sent to Scotland. In 1915 and was sent to Switzerland by prisoner exchange. After the war he studied art history in Bern and Zurich, then in Frankfurt and Munich, where he received his doctorate under Heinrich Wölfflin. He then worked for Max J. Friedlander in the Berlin print cabinet Kupferstichkabinett Berlin, where he also had contact with Wilhelm von Bode. In 1932, Friedländer and Rosenberg published their book on the paintings of Lucas Cranach the Elder (Die Gemälde von Lucas Cranach der Äe.). In 1935 he became a curator at the Kupferstickkabinett. Rosenberg was of Jewish descent, and resigned from his position in the same year. Many Jews were being dismissed from positions at the time in accordance with the Nuremberg Laws of the National Socialist regime in Germany. His colleague Friedländer had retired in 1933 for similar reasons. Their work on Lucas Cranach was interrupted, and their second book on Cranach's drawings was only published in 1960, two years after Friedländer's death in the Netherlands.

After a visit to Harvard University in 1936, Jakob Rosenberg emigrated to the United States in 1937 and became a research fellow and at Harvard on the recommendations from Adolph Goldschmidt and his friend Paul Sachs. In 1940 he was appointed as an associate professor and in 1947 as a full professor. His 1948 overview work on Rembrandt was reprinted in 1964 and 1968, holding its own as a standard work during the early years of the Rembrandt Research Project. He was also director of the Graphic Collection of the Museum of Fine Arts, Boston from 1939, and was appointed as Curator of Prints at the Fogg Museum in 1949.

In 1954 he was elected to the American Academy of Arts and Sciences.

Jakob Rosenberg married Elisabeth Husserl (1882–1981), daughter of Edmund Husserl, in 1922. He was survived by his wife and by two children, Wolfgang Rosenberg and Ruth Medalia.

Publications
Die Handzeichnungen von Martin Schongauer. München 1923 (Dissertation).

 with Max J. Friedländer, : 
with Max J. Friedländer: 

with Seymour Slive and Engelbert H. ter Kuile: 

with Max J. Friedländer: 
with Max J. Friedländer: 
with Max J. Friedländer:

References

Further reading 

German art historians
Rembrandt scholars
Emigrants from Nazi Germany to the United States
American art historians
1893 births
1980 deaths
People from Berlin